Clear Grits were reformers in the Canada West district of the Province of United Canada, a British colony that is now the Province of Ontario, Canada. Their name is said to have been given by David Christie, who said that only those were wanted in the party who were "all sand and no dirt, clear grit all the way through".

Their support was concentrated among southwestern Canada West farmers, who were frustrated and disillusioned by the 1849 Reform government of Robert Baldwin and Louis-Hippolyte Lafontaine's lack of democratic enthusiasm.  The Clear Grits advocated universal male suffrage, representation by population, democratic institutions, reductions in government expenditure, abolition of the Clergy Reserves, voluntarism, and free trade with the United States.  Clear Grits from Upper Canada shared many ideas with Thomas Jefferson.

History
The Clear Grit platform was first laid out at a convention held at Markham in March 1850, which included the following planks:

The abrogation of the rectories, and the secularization of the Clergy Reserves.
Retrenchment in provincial expenditure.
Abolition of the pensioning system.
The appointment of all local officials by local municipal councils.
Thorough judicial reform, especially the abolition of the court of chancery.
A great extension of the elective franchise, and vote by ballot.
Repeal of the law of primogeniture.
Abolition of copyright.
The right of the people to discuss peacefully any question affecting the government or constitution of the colony.
Election of the three branches of the legislature by the people of the dominion.

Initially led by Peter Perry, they later came under the leadership of Toronto newspaper editor George Brown, and in 1857 joined with the Reform Party, which was a loose alliance of liberal-minded reformers that became the Ontario Liberal Party and Liberal Party of Canada.

Impact
The "Clear Grits" was one of a long series of farmer-based radical reform movements. Later examples were the United Farmers and the Co-operative Commonwealth Federation, the direct ancestor of the modern New Democratic Party.

See also

Liberalism
Contributions to liberal theory
Liberalism worldwide
List of liberal parties
Liberal democracy
Liberalism in Canada
Politics of Canada
Tories

References

External links
 
 

Canada 1849
 Political parties in Upper Canada